Agenda Parva is a mostly Latin-language religious book, which was published in 1622 in Braunsberg (nowadays Braniewo). The book was meant to be used by clergymen of Livonia. Besides Latin-language text, the book consists of Latvian, Estonian (South Estonian), Polish and German text. The book is considered to be the oldest source of South Estonian language.

See also
 Timeline of early Estonian publications

References

Further reading
 A. Saareste. Agenda Parva (1622) keelest. – Eesti Keel 1938
 O. Freymuth. Agenda Parva Brunsbergae M.DC.XXII: eestikeelseid tekste vastureformatsiooniaegsest katoliku preestrite käsiraamatust. Tartu, 1938 
 A. Kask. Eesti kirjakeele ajaloost I. Tartu, 1970
 V. Helk. Jesuiitide tegevusest Tartus. – Tulimuld 1962, 1
 J. Peebo. Wastse Testamendi lugu. Tallinn, 2001

Estonian books
Estonian language
1622 books